Mike Mickens (born July 24, 1987) is a former American football cornerback in the National Football League for the Dallas Cowboys, Tampa Bay Buccaneers and Cincinnati Bengals. He played college football at the University of Cincinnati. He is currently the cornerbacks' coach for the University of Notre Dame.

Early years
Mickens attended Wayne High School, where he helped his team to two league titles and a 24-9 record. He posted in his career 205 tackles, 10 interceptions, 4 blocked field goals and one kickoff returned for a touchdown. He received All-Greater Western Ohio Conference honors twice. 

He also practiced track and field, winning the 300 metres hurdles state title as a junior and placing second on the 4 × 400 metres relay team at the state finals as a sophomore.

College career
Mickens accepted a football scholarship from the University of Cincinnati. As a freshman, he earned the starter right cornerback position during the preseason practices and went on to become an impact player, registering 51 tackles (sixth on the team), 15 passes defensed (second in the nation) and one interception. 

As a sophomore, he was moved to left cornerback, collecting 59 tackles (sixth on the team), 15 passes deflected (eighth in the nation), 3 interceptions, one quarterback pressure, one forced fumble and one fumble recovery. 

He received All-American honors as a junior, after recording 53 tackles, 6 interceptions (second in school history) and 12 passes defensed. He combined with fellow cornerback DeAngelo Smith to register a total of 14 interceptions, the most by a cornerback duo in college football in 2007. He had 6 tackles and 2 interceptions, including one returned for a 45-yard touchdown against Southeast Missouri State University. He had 7 tackles, one interception and one fumble recovery against Marshall University.

Mickens elected to return to school for his senior season, but suffered a left knee injury during a practice on November 20, 2008. He started 11 games at left cornerback, but missed the last 3 regular season games. He returned to play in the 2009 Orange Bowl, although he struggled in the contest. He finished the year with 70 tackles (second on the team), 2 tackles for loss, 10 passes defensed and 4 interceptions (tied for the team lead). He had 14 tackles and 3 passes defensed against the University of Akron. He had 11 tackles and on pass defensed against West Virginia University.

He left as the school's career leader in interceptions (14) and interception return yards (296). He started 46 out of 47 games, while registering 233 tackles (8 for loss), 48 passes defensed, one sack, one forced fumble and 2 fumble recoveries.

Professional career

Dallas Cowboys
Mickens was considered a possible first round talent, but ended up being selected in the seventh round (227th overall) of the 2009 NFL Draft by the Dallas Cowboys. He dropped because of concerns about the left knee injury he suffered in college, that caused him to run 4.53 at his Pro Day.

He was waived on September 5, after showing a lack of speed and quickness. He was signed to the practice squad with the hope that he could return to his old form.

Tampa Bay Buccaneers
The Tampa Bay Buccaneers signed him from the Dallas Cowboys practice squad on November 2, 2009. He was declared inactive in three games, before being released on November 24.

Cincinnati Bengals
The Cincinnati Bengals signed him to their practice squad on November 30, 2009. He was released on April 15, 2010.

Calgary Stampeders
On May 27, 2010, Mickens signed with the Calgary Stampeders of the Canadian Football League. He was released on June 9 and decided to retire because of injury.

Coaching career
In 2011, he was a defensive assistant at the University of Cincinnati. In 2012, he was a defensive assistant at Indiana State University. In 2013, he became the cornerbacks coach at the University of Idaho. In 2014, he moved on to Bowling Green State University to be the cornerbacks coach. In 2014, he was named the cornerbacks coach at Bowling Green. 

In December 2017, it was announced that he was joining Kent State as the team's secondary coach. In January 2018, he was named the Cincinnati cornerbacks coach. In February 2020, he was hired as the cornerbacks' coach at the University of Notre Dame, reuniting with Brian Kelly, who was his head coach at the University of Cincinnati.

References

1987 births
Living people
People from Huber Heights, Ohio
Players of American football from Ohio
American football cornerbacks
Canadian football defensive backs
American players of Canadian football
Cincinnati Bearcats football players
Dallas Cowboys players
Tampa Bay Buccaneers players
Cincinnati Bengals players
Cincinnati Bearcats football coaches
Indiana State Sycamores football coaches
Idaho Vandals football coaches
Bowling Green Falcons football coaches
Kent State Golden Flashes football coaches